Epierus is a genus of clown beetles in the family Histeridae. There are more than 50 described species in Epierus.

Species
These 54 species belong to the genus Epierus:

 Epierus alberti Marseul, 1861
 Epierus alutaceus Marseul, 1854
 Epierus angularis Schmidt, 1896
 Epierus antillarum Marseul, 1854
 Epierus beccarii Marseul, 1871
 Epierus binasutus Cooman, 1935
 Epierus bisbistriatus Marseul, 1854
 Epierus biscissus Marseul, 1880
 Epierus brunnipennis Marseul, 1854
 Epierus comptus Erichson, 1834
 Epierus cornutus Casey, 1893
 Epierus cubensis Casey
 Epierus cylindricus Wenzel, 1944
 Epierus dalaunayi Lewis, 1890
 Epierus decipiens J. L. LeConte, 1851
 Epierus duplicatus Casey
 Epierus floridanus Casey
 Epierus foveolatus Hinton, 1935
 Epierus fulvicornis (Fabricius, 1801)
 Epierus humeristrius Schmidt, 1889
 Epierus incultus Marseul, 1854
 Epierus inscriptus Schmidt, 1896
 Epierus insularis Schmidt, 1889
 Epierus invidus Marseul, 1861
 Epierus kraatzi Schmidt, 1889
 Epierus laevistrius Marseul, 1854
 Epierus latior Bickhardt, 1920
 Epierus longulus Marseul, 1854
 Epierus lucidulus Erichson, 1834
 Epierus lucus Lewis, 1884
 Epierus mariae Marseul, 1861
 Epierus mehicanus J. E. LeConte, 1860
 Epierus nasicornis Bickhardt, 1914
 Epierus nasutus Horn, 1873
 Epierus nemoralis Lewis, 1892
 Epierus notius Marseul, 1861
 Epierus obesulus Casey
 Epierus oblongus Casey
 Epierus obsolescens Casey
 Epierus ovalis Casey
 Epierus planulus Erichson, 1834
 Epierus pulicarius Erichson, 1834
 Epierus regularis (Palisot de Beauvois, 1818)
 Epierus sauteri Bickhardt, 1913
 Epierus scitus Lewis, 1888
 Epierus smaragdinus Marseul, 1862
 Epierus subtropicus Casey
 Epierus toxopei Desbordes, 1926
 Epierus uenoi Ôhara, 1994
 Epierus vandepolli Schmidt, 1889
 Epierus vethi (Bickhardt, 1912)
 Epierus vicinus J. L. LeConte, 1851
 Epierus villiersi Cooman, 1938
 Epierus waterhousii Marseul, 1854

References

Further reading

External links

 

Histeridae
Articles created by Qbugbot